Judah Halevi (also Yehuda Halevi or ha-Levi;  and Judah ben Shmuel Halevi ;  Yahuḏa al-Lāwī;  1075 – 1141) was a Spanish Jewish physician, poet and philosopher. He was born in Spain, either in Toledo or Tudela, in 1075 or 1086, and died shortly after arriving in the Holy Land in 1141, at that point the Crusader Kingdom of Jerusalem.

Halevi is considered one of the greatest Hebrew poets, celebrated both for his religious and secular poems, many of which appear in present-day liturgy. His greatest philosophical work was the Sefer ha-Kuzari.

Biography 
Convention suggests that Judah ben Shmuel Halevi was born in Toledo, Spain in 1075. He often described himself as coming from Christian territory. Alfonso the Battler conquered Tudela in 1119; Toledo was conquered by Alfonso VI from the Muslims in Halevi's childhood (1086).  As a youth, he seems to have gone to Granada, the main centre of Jewish literary and intellectual life at the time, where he found a mentor in Moses Ibn Ezra.  Although it is often said that he studied in the academy at Lucena, there is no evidence to this effect. He did compose a short elegy on the death of Isaac Alfasi, the head of the academy. His aptitude as a poet was recognized early. He was educated in traditional Jewish scholarship, in Arabic literature, and in the Greek sciences and philosophy that were available in Arabic. As an adult he was a physician, apparently of renown, and an active participant in Jewish communal affairs. For at least part of his life he lived in Toledo and may have been connected with the court there as a physician. In Toledo he complains of being too busy with medicine to devote himself to scholarship. At other times he lived in various Muslim cities in the south.

Like most Jewish intellectuals of Muslim Spain, Halevi wrote prose in Arabic and poetry in Hebrew. During the "Hebrew Golden Age" of the 10th to 12th century, he was the most prolific of the Hebrew poets and was regarded by some of his contemporaries, as well as by modern critics, as the greatest of all the medieval Hebrew poets. Like all the Hebrew poets of the Hebrew Golden Age, he employed the formal patterns of Arabic poetry, both the classical monorhymed patterns and the recently invented strophic patterns. His themes embrace all those that were current among Hebrew poets: panegyric odes, funeral odes, poems on the pleasures of life, gnomic epigrams, and riddles. He was also a prolific author of religious verse. As with all the Hebrew poets of his age, he strives for a strictly biblical diction, though he unavoidably falls into occasional calques from Arabic. His verse is distinguished by special attention to acoustic effect and wit.

Nothing is known of Halevi's personal life except the report in his poems that he had a daughter and that she had a son, also named Judah. He could well have had other children. The tradition that this daughter was married to Abraham Ibn Ezra does not rest on any evidence, though Halevi and Abraham Ibn Ezra were well acquainted, as we know from the writings of the latter.

Journey to Israel 
Halevi's various residences in Spain are unknown; he seems to have lived at times in Christian Toledo, at other times in Islamic Spain. Although he occupied an honored position as a physician, intellectual, and communal leader, his religious convictions may have compelled him to want to abandon his homeland to spend his final days in Israel. His motivations were likely complex, so he may have felt equally motivated by devotion, depression, and curiosity. The Halkin biography explores the idea that he enjoyed "celebrity" for decades, and suggests that the loss of significant family and friends may have motivated the perilous travels. 

The uncertainties of Jewish communal status in the period of the Reconquista or the failure of messianic movements may have weighed on him as well, as he considered the future security of the Jewish position in the diaspora. In his treatise known as the Kuzari, he claimed that true religious fulfillment is possible only in the presence of the God of Israel, which, the text suggested, was most palpable in the Land of Israel. Contrary to a prevalent theory, his poetry shows beyond doubt that his pilgrimage was a completely individual act and that he had no intention of setting off a mass pilgrimage. 

Halevi sailed for Alexandria from Spain. Arriving on September 8, 1140, he was greeted enthusiastically by friends and admirers. He then went to Cairo, where he visited several dignitaries, including the Nagid of Egypt, Samuel ben Hanania, and his friend Halfon ben Nathaniel Halevi. He did not permit himself to be persuaded to remain in Egypt, but returned to Alexandria and sailed for Israel on May 14, 1141. Little is known of his travels after this moment. It is estimated Halevi died in July or August, possibly after having reached Palestine, based on a letter from Abu Nasr ben Avraham to Halfon ben Netanel dated November 12, 1141. Legend also has it that Halevi was killed by an Arab horseman as he arrived in Jerusalem, with the first account found within a Hebrew miscellany published around 450 years after Halevi's presumed death. 

An 1141 letter to a prominent rabbi in Damascus also potentially refers to Halevi's death at the gates of Jerusalem. As only fragments are preserved of this letter, it's unclear whether the writer is discussing Halevi or another Jew. 

During his last years, Halevi's poetry dealt extensively with the idea of the pilgrimage and described some of it. Documents that remain are
panegyric to his various hosts in Egypt, explorations of his religious motivations, description of storms at sea, and expressions of his anxieties and doubts. We are well informed about the details of his pilgrimage thanks to letters that were preserved in the Cairo geniza. Poems and letters bearing on Halevi's pilgrimage are translated and explicated in Raymond P. Scheindlin, The Song of the Distant Dove (Oxford University Press, 2007).

His work 

The life-work of Judah Halevi was devoted to poetry and philosophy. The scholar Jose de la Fuente Salvat elevates him as the "most important poet in Judaism of all times".

Manuscripts give some grounds for believing that Halevi himself divided his oeuvre into sacred (shirei hakodesh) and profane (shirei hahol) poetry. The poetry can be divided as follows (following the 1895-1904 edition by Hayyim Brody):
 Poems about friendship and laudatory poems (shirei yedidut veshirei hakavod): 138 poems.
 Pieces of correspondence in rhymed prose (mikhtavim): 7 pieces.
 Love poems (shirei ahavah): 66 poems, including homoerotic poems such as “That Day While I Had Him” and “To Ibn Al-Mu’allim”
 Elegies (kol bochim; kinot vehespedim): 43 pieces.
 Elevation of the soul to Zion; travelling poems (massa nefesh tziyonah; shirei tziyon veshirei massa): 23 poems.
 Riddle poems (ḥidot): 49 poems.
 Other poems, various poems (she’erit Yehudah; shirim shonim): 120 poems.

Secular poetry 
Judah's secular or non-liturgical poetry is occupied by poems of friendship, love, tenderness, humor, and eulogy. Judah must have possessed an attractive personality; for there gathered about him as friends, even in his earliest youth, a large number of illustrious men, like Levi al-Tabban of Zaragoza, the aged poet Judah ben Abun, Judah ibn Ghayyat of Granada, Moses ibn Ezra and his brothers Judah, Joseph, and Isaac, the vizier Abu al-Hasan, Meïr ibn Kamnial, the physician and poet Solomon ben Mu'allam of Seville, besides his schoolmates Joseph ibn Migas and Baruch Albalia. Also the grammarian Abraham ibn Ezra.

In Córdoba, Judah addressed a touching farewell poem to Joseph ibn Ẓaddiḳ, the philosopher and poet. In Egypt, where the most celebrated men vied with one another in entertaining him, his reception was a veritable triumph. Here his particular friends were Aaron ben Jeshua Alamani in Alexandria, the nagid Samuel ben Hananiah in Cairo, Halfon ha-Levi in Damietta, and an unknown man in Tyre, probably his last friend. In their sorrow and joy, in the creative spirit and all that moved the souls of these men, Judah sympathetically shared; as he says in the beginning of a short poem: "My heart belongs to you, ye noble souls, who draw me to you with bonds of love".

Especially tender and plaintive is Judah's tone in his elegies Many of them are dedicated to friends such as the brothers Judah (Nos. 19, 20), Isaac (No. 21), and Moses ibn Ezra (No. 16), R. Baruch (Nos. 23, 28), Meïr ibn Migas (No. 27), his teacher Isaac Alfasi (No. 14), and others.  In the case of Solomon ibn Farissol, who was murdered on May 3, 1108, Judah suddenly changed his poem of eulogy (Nos. 11, 22) into one of lamentation (Nos. 12, 13, 93 et seq.).  Child mortality due to plague was high in Judah's time and the historical record contains five elegies written for the occasion of the death of a child.  Biographer Hillel Halkin hypothesizes that at least one of these elegiac poems may have been written in honor of one of Judah's children who did not reach adulthood and who is lost to history.

Halevi's poetry includes verses relating to his vocational work as a physician. Halevi's prayer for the physician was first translated into English in 1924.

Love songs 
Joyous, careless youth, and merry, happy delight in life find their expression in his love-songs.  Many of these are epithalamia and are characterized by a brilliant Near-Eastern coloring, as well as by a chaste reserve. In Egypt, where the muse of his youth found a glorious "Indian summer" in the circle of his friends, he wrote his "swan-song:" "Wondrous is this land to see, With perfume its meadows laden, But more fair than all to me Is yon slender, gentle maiden. Ah, Time's swift flight I fain would stay, Forgetting that my locks are gray."

Drinking songs by Judah have also been preserved.

Riddles 
Judah is noted as the most prolific composer of Hebrew riddles, with a corpus of at least sixty-seven riddles, some of which survive in his own hand, and even in draft form, though only a few have been translated into English. Judah's riddles are mostly short, monorhyme compositions on concrete subjects such as everyday artefacts, animals and plants, or a name or word; one example is the following:
 What is it that's blind with an eye in its head,
 But the race of mankind its use can not spare;
 Spends all its life in clothing the dead,
 But always itself is naked and bare?

Religious poetry 
After living a life devoted to worldly pleasures, Halevi was to experience a kind of "awakening"; a shock, that changed his outlook on the world. Like a type of "conversion" experience, he turned from the life of pleasure, and his poetry turned to religious themes. Halevi became a prolific author of piyyutim.

It seems that his profound experience was the consequence of his sensitivity to the events of history that were unfolding around him. He lived during the First Crusade and other wars. There was a new kind of religio-political fanaticism emerging in the Christian and Muslim worlds. Holy wars were brewing, and Halevi may have recognized that such trends had never been good for the Jews. At the time, life was relatively good in Spain for the Jewish community. He may have suspected things were about to change for the worse, however.

His attachment to the Jewish people is an equally significant theme: he identifies his sufferings and hopes with that of the broader group. Like the authors of the Psalms, he gladly sinks his own identity in the wider one of the people of Israel; so that it is not always easy to distinguish the personality of the speaker.

Often Judah's poetic fancy finds joy in the thought of the "return" of his people to the Promised Land. He believed that perfect Jewish life was possible only in the Land of Israel. The period of political agitation about 1130, when the conflict between Islam and Christianity intensified, giving Judah reason to hope for such a return in the near future. The vision of the night, in which this was revealed to him, remained indeed but a dream; yet Judah never lost faith in the eventual deliverance of Israel, and in "the eternity" of his people. On this subject, he has expressed himself in poetry:
Lo! Sun and moon, these minister for aye; The laws of day and night cease nevermore: Given for signs to Jacob's seed that they Shall ever be a nation — till these be o'er. If with His left hand He should thrust away, Lo! with His right hand He shall draw them nigh.

His piyyut, Mi Kamokha, was translated by Samuel di Castelnuovo and published in Venice in 1609.

Liturgical poetry 
The longest, and most comprehensive poem is a "Kedushah," which summons all the universe to praise God with rejoicing, and which terminates, curiously enough, in Psalm 103. These poems were carried to all lands, even as far as India, and they influenced the rituals of the most distant countries. Even the Karaites incorporated some of them into their prayer-book; so that there is scarcely a synagogue in which Judah's songs are not sung in the course of the service. The following observation on Judah's synagogal poems is made by Zunz:
As the perfume and beauty of a rose are within it, and do not come from without, so with Judah word and Bible passage, meter and rime, are one with the soul of the poem; as in true works of art, and always in nature, one is never disturbed by anything external, arbitrary, or extraneous.

Judah also wrote several Sabbath hymns. One of the most beautiful of them ends with the words:
On Friday doth my cup o'erflow / What blissful rest the night shall know / When, in thine arms, my toil and woe / Are all forgot, Sabbath my love!
'Tis dusk, with sudden light, distilled / From one sweet face, the world is filled; / The tumult of my heart is stilled / For thou art come, Sabbath my love!
Bring fruits and wine and sing a gladsome lay, / Cry, 'Come in peace, O restful Seventh day!'

Judah used complicated Arabic meters in his poems, with much good taste. A later critic, applying a Talmudic witticism to Judah, has said: "It is hard for the dough when the baker himself calls it bad." Although these forms came to him naturally and without effort, unlike the mechanical versifiers of his time, he would not except himself from the number of those he had blamed. His pupil Solomon Parḥon, who wrote at Salerno in 1160, relates that Judah repented having used the new metrical methods, and had declared he would not again employ them. That Judah felt them to be out of place, and that he opposed their use at the very time when they were in vogue, plainly shows his desire for a national Jewish art; independent in form, as well as in matter.

In 1422, Provencal Jewish scholar Jacob ben Chayyim Comprat Vidal Farissol published a commentary on Judah's liturgical poem "Cuzari".

Judah was recognized by his contemporaries as "the great Jewish national poet", and in succeeding generations, by all the great scholars and writers in Israel. His poetry and writing have also been considered an early expression of support for Jewish nationalism.

Analysis of his poetry 

The remarkable, and apparently indissoluble, union of religion, nationalism, and patriotism, which were so characteristic of post-exilic Judaism, reached its acme in Judah Halevi and his poetry. Yet this very union, in one so consistent as Judah, demanded the fulfillment of the supreme politico-religious ideal of medieval Judaism—the "return to Jerusalem". Though his impassioned call to his contemporaries to return to "Zion" might be received with indifference, or even with mockery; his own decision to go to Jerusalem never wavered. "Can we hope for any other refuge either in the East or in the West where we may dwell in safety?" he exclaims to one of his opponents (ib.). The songs that accompany his pilgrimage sound like one great symphony, wherein the "Zionides" — the single motive never varied — voice the deepest "soul-life" alike; of the Jewish people and of each individual Jew.

The most celebrated of these "Zionides" is commonly in the synagogue on Tisha B'Av:
Zion, wilt thou not ask if peace's wing / Shadows the captives that ensue thy peace / Left lonely from thine ancient shepherding?
Lo! west and east and north and south — world-wide / All those from far and near, without surcease / Salute thee: Peace and Peace from every side."

As a philosopher 

Judah Halevi's vision of a God that is accessed through tradition and devotion, and not philosophical speculation, dominates his later work. His position in domain of Jewish philosophy is parallel to that occupied in Islam by al-Ghazali, by whom he was influenced, yet Judah Halevi strongly despised Islam. Like al-Ghazali, Judah endeavored to liberate religion from the bondage of the various philosophical systems in which it had been held by his predecessors, Saadia, David ben Marwan al-Mekamez, Gabirol, and Bahya. In a work written in Arabic, and entitled Kitab al-Ḥujjah wal-Dalil fi Nuṣr al-Din al-Dhalil, كتاب الحجة و الدليل في نصرة الدين الذليل, (known in the Hebrew translation of Judah ibn Tibbon by the title Sefer ha-Kuzari), Judah Halevi expounded his views upon the teachings of Judaism, which he defended against the attacks of non-Jewish philosophers, Aristotelian Greek philosophers and against those he viewed as "heretics".

Editions 
The main edition of Halevi's diwan is Heinrich Brody, Dîwân des Abû-l-Hasan Jehudah ha-Levi/Diwan wĕ-hu 'sefer kolel šire 'abir ha-mešorerim Yĕhudah ben Šĕmu'el ha-Levi. 4 vols (Berlin: Itzkowski, 1894-1930): vol. 1, vol. 2 part 2 (notes), pp. 157-330, vol. 3, pp. 1-144, vol. 3, pp. 145-308, vol. 4. In the 2002 assessment of Tova Rosen and Eli Yassif, this is 'a flawed edition marred by numerous textual mistakes and by the erroneous inclusion of poems by other poets. It was also far from including ha-Levi’s complete oeuvre'. However, 'even today, nearly a century after Brody’s effort, there is still no authorized edition of Judah ha-Levi’s work. The absence of such an edition has been, and will continue to be, an obstacle toward the completion of any creditable study of ha-Levi’s poetry.' Other editions exist of some individual works.

 Selected Poems of Jehuda Halevi, ed. by Heinrich Brody and Harry Elson, trans. by Nina Salaman (Philadelphia: The Jewish Publication Society of America, 1974),  [first publ. 1924].
 Poemas sagrados y profanos de Yehuda Halevi, trans. by Maximo Jose Kahn and Juan Gil-Albert (Mexico, [Ediciones mensaje] 1943).
 Yehuda Ha-Leví: Poemas, trans. by Ángel Sáenz-Badillos and Judit Targarona Borrás (Madrid: Clasicos Alfaguara, 1994)
 Las 'Sĕlīḥot la-'ašmurot' de R. Yehudah ha-Leví: traducción y estudio literario, ed. and trans. by M.ª Isabel Pérez Alonso, Colección vítor, 415 (Salamanca: Ediciones Universidad de Salamanca, 2017),

References

External links

JUDAH HALEVI Encyclopaedia Judaica article by Daniel J. Lasker and Angel Sáenz-Badillos at Encyclopedia.com
Judah Halevi by Barry Kogan at Stanford Encyclopedia of Philosophy
"Yehudah Ha-Levi: Poet Philosopher of Sepharad," Video Lecture by Dr. Henry Abramson of Touro College South
The Kitab al-Khazari of Judah Hallevi, full English translation at sacred-texts.com
The Kitab al-Khazari of Judah Hallevi, Judeo-Arabic original
Poems by Judah Ha-Levi – English translations.

1070s births
1141 deaths
11th-century Jews from al-Andalus
Philosophers of Judaism
Spanish philosophers
Khazar studies
Hebrew-language poets
Jewish poets
Jewish apologists
People from Toledo, Spain
12th-century Castilian rabbis
Judeo-Arabic writers